Ebern is a town in the Haßberge district of Bavaria, Germany. Its population is about 8,000. Its mayor is Robert Herrmann.

Ebern is about 1,000 years old and has an intact defensive wall.

Villages of Ebern
The borough of Ebern covers an area of  within which are 18 villages as well as the town of Ebern itself.

Founding legend
According to legend, one day two hunters were chasing a wild boar. It was finally struck by two spears, one from each of the hunters. They could not decide who threw the spear that killed the boar. The boar finally fell exactly on the border between Seßlach and Ebern, with its head in Ebern, and its body in Seßlach, so they divided it. Hence the town of Ebern is named after the boar, and the municipal flag displays a boar's head.

Sons and daughters of the town 
 Johann Georg Meusel (1743-1820), historian, lexicographical and bibliographer

 Ingrid Schubert (1944-1977), a founding member of the Red Army Faction

References

Haßberge (district)